Antonio de Jesus Villegas (January 9, 1928 – November 16, 1984) was a Filipino who served as the 18th Mayor of Manila from 1962 to 1971. His term was after the term of Arsenio Lacson as mayor of Manila, and before the period of martial law in the Philippines.

Political career

Villegas was elected as vice mayor of Manila in 1959 and became the city mayor when Arsenio Lacson died in 1962 with over one year left on his term. 

In 1963, he ran for reelection under the Liberal Party (LP) banner and won against Nacionalista Party (NP) Congressman Roberto Oca.

Villegas inaugurated the "Manila Film Festival" ("Manila Tagalog Film Festival") in 1966, the precursor of the modern Metro Manila Film Festival. Foreign films were banned from being screened during the duration of the film festival. The annual event was discontinued during the tenure of Villegas' successor in the 1970s.

In 1967, he ran again for reelection and won against NP Congressman Pablo Ocampo. His victory along with his party council members in Manila was the only major victory enjoyed by the LP in 1967. All of the LP senatorial candidates except for Benigno "Ninoy" Aquino were defeated by the opposing Nacionalista Party.

In 1971, then-Congressman Ramon Bagatsing was chosen by the Liberal Party to run for Manila mayor, while Vice-Mayor Felicisimo Cabigao remained NP's bet for mayor; Villegas was left without a party. He formed the Libre'ng Pilipino Party (LPP) to run for reelection as mayor in the 1971 local election, and selected journalist J.V. Cruz to be his running mate; Villegas ultimately lost to Bagatsing. In the police investigation into the Plaza Miranda bombing in August 1971, which was attended by members of the Liberal Party, Villegas was named the primary suspect of the bombing, but later evidence suggested otherwise.

Later life and death
After losing in the 1971 local mayoral elections to then Manila Congressman Ramon Bagatsing, Villegas and his entire family emigrated to the United States.

He remained in Reno, Nevada, with his wife Lydia Alano Villegas, until his death on November 16, 1984. His coffin was exhumed from Reno cemetery and flown to the Philippines in October 1997. A memorial ceremony was held in Manila City Hall. Eulogies by the Villegas family, then-Mayor Alfredo Lim, and Senator Blas Ople were given. Villegas's body was finally buried in a plot located along the rotunda of Manila North Cemetery.

Writings
Manila, 1962: Mayor Antonio J. Villegas reports (1963)
Building a Better Manila (1963)
Manila: Its Needs and Resources (1966)
Dahong Alaala (1968)
To End the Reign of Misery and Strife ... Libre'ng Pilipino (1971)

References

People from Tondo, Manila
Mayors of Manila
1928 births
1984 deaths
Liberal Party (Philippines) politicians
Burials at the Manila North Cemetery